Mary Helen (also known as Coalgood) is an unincorporated community in  Harlan County, Kentucky, United States.

References

Unincorporated communities in Harlan County, Kentucky
Unincorporated communities in Kentucky